The Transfer Act of 1905 (33 Stat. 628) transferred the forest reserves of the United States from the Department of the Interior, General Land Office to the Department of Agriculture, Bureau of Forestry.

General information
On February 1, 1905, under the leadership of Gifford Pinchot, the National Forest Reserves were transferred from the Department of Interior to the Department of Agriculture. Gifford Pinchot was the head of the Division of Forestry which was part of the Department of Agriculture.  This transfer included over 63 million acres (250,000 km2)  of forest reserves and over 500 employees. This legislation was the first forestry law to be passed. This act was significant because it caused the National Forest Reserves to shift roles from a recreational role to a more economic role using science-based management. In March 1905, the Division of Forestry was renamed the United States Forest Service.

References
The Forest Service in 1905, by David D. Roth, PHD and Gerald W. Williams, PHD(Rich Text Document)
Documentary Chronology of Selected Events in the Development of the American Conservation Movement
Bridges Within the National Forest System—A Historic Context

United States federal public land legislation